Legge's hawk-eagle (Nisaetus kelaarti) is a bird of prey. Like all eagles, it is in the family Accipitridae. It breeds in the Indian subcontinent, from southern India to Sri Lanka. Its specific name kelaarti honors the physician-zoologist E.F. Kelaart.

Legge's hawk-eagle is a medium-sized eagle and fairly large-sized raptor. The typical adult has brown upperparts and pale underparts, with barring on the undersides of the flight feathers and tail. The breast and belly are heavily streaked. The wings are broad with a curved trailing edge, and are held in a shallow V in flight. Sexes are similar, but young birds are often whiter-headed.

Legge's hawk-eagle was formerly considered to be a subspecies of the mountain hawk-eagle, but it is smaller and has unstreaked buff underwing coverts. A 2008 study based on the geographic isolation and differences in call suggested that this be treated as a full species, Nisaetus kelaarti. When all standard measurements are considered, Legge's hawk-eagles average about 5-10% smaller than mountain hawk eagles, although Legge's tail length is slightly greater on average.

It is a bird of mountain woodland that builds a stick nest in a tree and lays usually a single egg in a clutch. Legge's hawk-eagles eat small mammals, birds and reptiles. Despite its relatively modest size, Legge's hawk-eagle is a powerful predator with large talons, like many booted eagles, and is sometimes known to occasionally pursue prey as heavy or heavier than itself. This may include Indian peafowl, estimated to weigh .

Notes

References

External links

Legge's hawk-eagle
Birds of South India
Birds of Sri Lanka
Legge's hawk-eagle
Legge's hawk-eagle